The Lyme–East Thetford Bridge is a historic bridge over the Connecticut River between Lyme, New Hampshire, and East Thetford, Vermont. From the New Hampshire side it carries East Thetford Road, which becomes Vermont Route 113 as it enters Vermont. The bridge was added to the National Register of Historic Places in 2020.

Description and history
The Lyme–East Thetford Bridge is located in a rural setting between the village of East Thetford on the Vermont side and Lyme village  to the east in New Hampshire. It consists of two Parker truss spans, set on concrete abutments and a central concrete pier. The trusses are fabricated out of rolled steel I-beams, and the main deck is steel covered by asphalt.

The bridge location was the site of a ferry as early as 1780. A bridge is documented at this site in the 1840s, and a bridge built in the 1890s was destroyed by flooding in 1936. The present bridge was constructed as a replacement for the latter bridge, its abutments and piers built higher as a defense against future flooding. The bridge trusses were fabricated by the American Bridge Company, and it was largely funded by the federal government through the Works Progress Administration. The bridge is fairly typical of truss bridges built in Vermont at the time, and is the longest two-span Parker truss in the state of New Hampshire. It is one of five Parker truss bridges spanning the Connecticut River.

See also

List of bridges on the National Register of Historic Places in New Hampshire
List of bridges on the National Register of Historic Places in Vermont
National Register of Historic Places listings in Grafton County, New Hampshire
National Register of Historic Places listings in Orange County, Vermont

References

Bridges completed in 1937
Bridges over the Connecticut River
Bridges in Grafton County, New Hampshire
Bridges in Orange County, Vermont
National Register of Historic Places in Grafton County, New Hampshire
National Register of Historic Places in Orange County, Vermont
Road bridges on the National Register of Historic Places in New Hampshire
Road bridges on the National Register of Historic Places in Vermont
Parker truss bridges in the United States
Lyme, New Hampshire